The Ava 4A was a low power flat-four (boxer engine) developed for very light aircraft in France in the 1930s. It was used by several prototypes and at least one production series.

Design and development

Marcel Violet was a French racing driver who designed his own two-cylinder, two-stroke engines. He also designed a two stroke horizontally opposed flat-four, which was built under licence at L'agence general moteurs "Ava" by Jean Aubry of the Société J. Thibault, G Aubry et Cie, alloy metal specialists, as the Ava 4A. It only produced  and was intended to power small, low cost, single seat aircraft, replacing the aging Anzanis and completing with the French Mengin Type B and the older British Bristol Cherub engines.

The Ava 4A was on display at the November 1936 Paris Salon. It powered several prototypes and also the forty-six examples of the  series production variant of the Farman Moustique, the F.451.

Variants
Ava 4A-00 , as described.
Ava 4A-02 Identical to 4A-00 except for  bore and increased compression, giving  continuous power. Weight .

Applications
Carmier T.10
Dart Pup
Dart Kitten
Druine D.30 Turbulent
Farman Moustique
Jodel D.98 Bébé
Mignet HM-14 Pou du Ciel
SFAN II
Starck AS90 New Look
Tipsy S

Survivors

A 4A-00 survives in a private collection and is sometimes exhibited on loan.

Specifications (4A-00)

References

Two-stroke aircraft piston engines
1930s aircraft piston engines
Boxer engines